
Year 615 (DCXV) was a common year starting on Wednesday (link will display the full calendar) of the Julian calendar. The denomination 615 for this year has been used since the early medieval period, when the Anno Domini calendar era became the prevalent method in Europe for naming years.

Events 
 By place 

 Europe 
 The Balkans are freely overrun by the Slavs, who settle in large numbers in what is now Bulgaria, Serbia, North Macedonia and parts of Greece. The western territories of modern-day Yugoslavia (Bosnia, Croatia and Dalmatia) suffer raids from the Avars, who settle in this region.
 The Slavs under Chatzon attack in longboats along the coasts of Thessaly, western Anatolia, and various Greek islands. They besiege the Byzantine city of Thessaloniki in a combined land and sea attack. The Slavs with their families encamp before the city walls.
 The city of Epidaurus (Dalmatia) is destroyed by the Avars and Slavic invaders. The Illyrian refugees flee to the nearby island Laus, where they found Dubrovnik (Ragusa). The islands of Rab, Krk and Cres become major food suppliers for the surviving cities of the mainland.
 Eleutherius succeeds John I as exarch of Ravenna. He persecutes those implicated in the murder of John and the judges of the State. After making a courtesy visit to Pope Adeodatus I, Eleutherius captures Naples and kills the rebel leader John of Conza.

 Britain 
 Bangor Massacre: The Anglo-Saxons, under King Æthelfrith of Northumbria, after defeating the Kingdom of Powys, finally reach the Irish Sea and massacre 1,200 Christian monks at their monastery, in Bangor (Wales).
 Edwin of Northumbria takes refuge in East Anglia; he marries Cwenburga, daughter of king Cearl of Mercia (according to the Historia ecclesiastica gentis Anglorum).

 Mesoamerica 
 July 29 – Queen Sak K'uk' is succeeded by her son Pacal the Great, as ruler of the Maya city state Palenque (Mexico). He begins a building program at his capital, that produces some of Maya civilization's finest art and architecture.

 By topic 

 Religion 
 May 25 – Pope Boniface IV dies after a 7-year reign, in which he has converted the Pantheon into the Church of "Santa Maria Rotonda". He is succeeded by Adeodatus I (also known as Deusdedit) as the 68th pope of Rome. 
 Several of Muhammad's followers begin to emigrate to the Aksumite Empire. They found a small colony there, under the protection of the Christian Ethiopian emperor Așhama ibn Abjar.An Introduction to the Quran (1895), p. 185

Births 
 Æbbe, Anglo-Saxon princess and abbess (approximate date)
 Begga, Frankish abbess and saint (d. 693)
 Bertin, Frankish abbot (approximate date)
 Buyeo Yung, prince of Baekje (d. 682)
 Fatimah, daughter of Muhammad (or 605) 
 Leodegar, bishop of Autun (approximate date)
 Li Jingxuan, official of the Tang Dynasty (d. 682)

Deaths 
 May 25 – Pope Boniface IV
 November 21 – Columbanus, Irish missionary (b. 543)
 Chatzon, chieftain of the Slavs 
 John I Lemigius, exarch of Ravenna
 John of Conza, Italian rebel leader
 Máel Coba mac Áedo, High King of Ireland
 Pybba, king of Mercia (approximate date)

References

Sources